This article contains information about the literary events and publications of 1564.

Events
January – János Zsámboky (Johannes Sambucus) completes the preface to his Emblemata.
February 6 – John Calvin, in the throes of his final illness, preaches his last sermon, in Geneva. 
March 1 – Ivan Fyodorov with Pyotr Mstislavets prints the Acts and Epistles of the Apostles (an Apostolos), the first printed work in the Russian language that can be dated, at the Moscow Print Yard.
unknown dates
A revised edition of the Index Librorum Prohibitorum, authorised by the Council of Trent, is printed in Venice.
A chained library (librije) with access for the public is attached to the church of St. Walburgis in Zutphen, Netherlands. It will still be extant with its original fittings in the 21st century.

New books

Prose
John Dee – Monas Hieroglyphica
Magdeburger Centurien (Magdeburg Centuries), volumes VII and VIII
Girolamo Maggi – Miscellanorum, seu Variarum Lectionum

Drama
Vishnu Varamballi – Virata Parva (earliest copy)

Poetry
See 1564 in poetry

Births
February 26 (baptised) – Christopher Marlowe, English dramatist and poet (died 1593)
March 9 – David Fabricius, German theologian (died 1617)
March 20 – Thomas Morton, English polemicist and bishop (died 1659)
April 26 (baptism, traditional date of birth April 23) – William Shakespeare, English dramatist and poet (died 1616)
Unknown dates
Jean D'Espagnet, French lawyer, politician and author (died c. 1637)
Kryštof Harant, Czech nobleman, traveller, humanist, soldier, writer and composer (died 1621)
Henry Reynolds, English poet, schoolmaster and literary critic (died 1632)
Juan de Aguilar Villaquirán, Spanish writer and translator (died 1618)
Probable birth year – Henry Chettle, English dramatist and pamphleteer (died c. 1607)

Deaths
March 5 – Friedrich Staphylus, German theologian (born 1512)
April – Pierre Belon, French naturalist and travel writer (murdered, born 1517)
April 1 – Christoph Froschauer, Swiss printer (plague, born c. 1490)
April 9 – Georg Hartmann, German humanist engineer, author and printer (born 1489)
May 27 – John Calvin, French-born theologian (born 1509)
August 11 – Edward Ferrers, credited as an English dramatist (unknown date of birth)
September 26 – Theodor Bibliander, German theologian and publisher (plague, born c. 1505)
Argula von Grumbach, German Protestant reformer (b. 1490)

References

Years of the 16th century in literature